The 1954–55 Landsdelsserien was a Norwegian second-tier football league season.

The league was contested by 54 teams, divided into a total of seven groups from four districts; Østland/Søndre, Østland/Nordre, Sørland/Vestre and Møre/Trøndelag. The two group winners in the Østland districts, Rapid and Frigg promoted directly to the 1955–56 Hovedserien. The other five group winners qualified for promotion play-offs to compete for two spots in the following season's top flight. Varegg and Kvik won the play-offs and were promoted.

Tables

District Østland/Søndre

District Østland/Nordre

District Sørland/Vestland

Group A1

Group A2

Group B

District Møre/Trøndelag

Møre

Trøndelag

Promotion play-offs
Sørland/Vestland 
Results A1–A2
Jerv 2–2 (a.e.t.) Bryne
Bryne 2–1 Jerv
Results A–B
Bryne 2–3 Varegg 

Varegg won 3–2 over Bryne and were promoted to Hovedserien.

Møre/Trøndelag
Kvik 4–0 Kristiansund
Kristiansund 2–1 Kvik

Kvik won 5–2 on aggregate and were promoted to Hovedserien.

References

Norwegian First Division seasons
1954 in Norwegian football
1955 in Norwegian football
Norway